Marwari (मारवाड़ी, IAST: Mārwāṛī; also rendered as Marwadi or Marvadi) is a Rajasthani language spoken in the Indian state of Rajasthan. Marwari is also found in the neighbouring states of Gujarat and Haryana, some adjacent areas in Eastern parts of Pakistan, and some migrant communities in Nepal. With some 7.8 million or so speakers (ce. 2011), it is one of the largest varieties of Rajasthani. Most speakers live in Rajasthan, with a quarter-million in Sindh and a tenth of that number in Nepal. There are two dozen dialects of Marwari.

Marwari is popularly written in Devanagari script, as are many languages of India and Nepal, including Hindi, Marathi, Nepali, and Sanskrit; although it was historically written in Mahajani, it is still written in the Perso-Arabic script by the Marwari minority in Eastern parts of Pakistan (the standard/western Naskh script variant is used in Sindh Province, and the eastern Nastalik variant is used in Punjab Province), where it has educational status but where it is rapidly shifting to Urdu.

Marwari has no official status in India and is not used as a language of education. Marwari is still spoken widely in Jodhpur, Pali, Jaisalmer, Barmer, Nagaur, Bikaner.

History 
It is believed that Marwari and Gujarati evolved from Gujjar Bhakha or Maru-Gurjar. Formal grammar of Gurjar Apabhraṃśa was written by Jain monk and Gujarati scholar Hemachandra Suri.

Geographical distribution 
Marwari is primarily spoken in the Indian state of Rajasthan. Marwari speakers have dispersed widely throughout India and other countries but are found most notably in the neighbouring state of Gujarat and in Eastern Pakistan. Speakers are also found in Bhopal. With around 7.9 million speakers in India according to the 2001 census.

There are several dialects: Thaḷī (spoken in eastern Jaisalmer district and northwestern Jodhpur district), Bhitrauti, Sirohī, Godwārī.

Lexis 
Indian Marwari [rwr] in Rajasthan shares a 50%–65% lexical similarity with Hindi (this is based on a Swadesh 210 word list comparison). It has many cognate words with Hindi.  Notable phonetic correspondences include /s/ in Hindi with /h/ in Marwari. For example, /sona/ 'gold' (Hindi) and /hono/ 'gold' (Marwari).

Pakistani Marwari [mve] shares 87% lexical similarity between its Southern subdialects in Sindh (Utradi, Jaxorati, and Larecha) and Northern subdialects in Punjab (Uganyo, Bhattipo, and Khadali), 79%–83% with Dhakti [mki], and 78% with Meghwar and Bhat Marwari dialects. Mutual intelligibility of Pakistani Marwari [mve] with Indian Marwari [rwr] is decreasing due to the rapid shift of active speakers in Pakistan to Urdu, their use of the Arabic script and different sources of support medias, and their separation from Indian Marwaris, even if there are some educational efforts to keep it active (but absence of official recognition by Pakistani or provincial government level). Many words have been borrowed from other Pakistani languages.

Merwari [wry] shares 82%–97% intelligibility of Pakistani Marwari [mve], with 60%–73% lexical similarity between Merwari varieties in Ajmer and Nagaur districts, but only 58%–80% with Shekhawati [swv], 49%–74% with Indian Marwari [rwr], 44%–70% with Godwari [gdx], 54%–72% with Mewari [mtr], 62%–70% with Dhundari [dhd], 57%–67% with Haroti [hoj]. Unlike Pakistani Marwari [mve], the use of Merwari remains vigorous, even if its most educated speakers also proficiently speak Hindi [hin].

Phonology

Nasalization of vowels is phonemic, all of the vowels can be nasalized.
Diphthongs are /ai, ia, ae, əi, ei, oi, ui, ua, uo/

Implosives are mostly only found word initially and it formed due to the influence of neighbouring languages.
// is [] before front vowels and [] elsewhere e.g. [ʋɪwwa] 'marriage'.

Morphology 
Marwari languages have a structure that is quite similar to Hindustani (Hindi or Urdu). Their primary word order is subject–object–verb Most of the pronouns and interrogatives used in Marwari are distinct from those used in Hindi; at least Marwari proper and Harauti have a clusivity distinction in their plural pronouns.

Vocabulary 

Marwari vocabulary is somewhat similar to other Western Indo-Aryan languages, especially Rajasthani and Gujarati, however, elements of grammar and basic terminology differ enough to significantly impede mutual intelligibility.

Writing system 
Marwari is generally written in the Devanagari script, although the Mahajani script is traditionally associated with the language. In Pakistan it is written in the Perso-Arabic script with modifications. Historical Marwari orthography for Devanagari uses other characters in place of standard Devanagari letters.

See also
 Lambadi
 List of Indian languages by total speakers
 Marwari Muslims
 Marwari people
 Shekhawati

References

Further reading
 Lakhan Gusain (2004). Marwari. Munich: Lincom Europa (LW/M 427)

External links 

 Hanvant's Rajasthani Dictionary

Western Indo-Aryan languages
Languages of Rajasthan
Languages of Punjab, Pakistan
Languages of Sindh
Marwar
Rajasthani languages
Languages of Nepal
Languages of Gujarat